Iain Lawrence (born 1955) is a bestselling Canadian author for children and young adults. In 2007 he won a Governor General’s Literary Award in Children’s Literature for Gemini Summer.

Biography
Lawrence was born in Sault Ste. Marie, Ontario, in 1955. He has lived on Gabriola Island since 2000. Lawrence attended Langara College in Vancouver studying journalism. After school he worked for the Prince Rupert Daily News and other newspapers in northern British Columbia. In his free time he wrote a number of unpublished children's fiction books, and was able to publish two non-fiction books about sailing, his hobby. A Chicago agent encouraged him to concentrate on children's fiction so he reworked one of his earlier books, The Wrecker, and sold it to Random House in 1994. Since then he has published many more books, in 2007 Random House reported he had sold more than one million books in North America.

Writing

Gemini Summer
The book was reviewed in Publishers Weekly, Quill and Quire, Kirkus Reviews, CM Magazine, Saskatoon StarPhoenix, The Horn Book Magazine, School Library Journal, Booklist, Library Media Connection, Resource Links, and Books in Canada.

Awards and honours

2007 Governor General's Award, Gemini Summer
2007 PNBA Book Award, Gemini Summer
2007 Bank Street College Best Book, Gemini Summer
2007 Sheila A. Egoff Children's Literature Prize, finalist, Gemini Summer

Bibliography
 The Skeleton Tree (2016)
 The Giant-Slayer (2009)
 The Seance (July 2008)
 Gemini Summer (October 2006)
 B for Boi (June 2004)
 The Lightkeeper's Daughter (September 2002)
 Lord of the Nutcracker Men (October 2001)
 Ghost Boy (October 2000)

The Curse of the Jolly Stone trilogy
 The Convicts (April 2004)
 The Cannibals (November 2005)
 The Castaways (November 2007)

The Wreckers series
 The Wreckers (May 1998)
 The Smugglers (May 1999)
 The Buccaneers (August 2001)

Non-fiction
 Far-Away Places: 50 Anchorages on the Northwest Coast (April 1995)

References

External links
 
 

1955 births
Canadian children's writers
Governor General's Award-winning children's writers
Living people
People from Sault Ste. Marie, Ontario
Writers from Ontario
Langara College people